Boulder Township is a township in Linn County, Iowa.

History
Boulder Township (historically spelled Bowlder) was organized in 1858.

References

Townships in Linn County, Iowa
Townships in Iowa
1858 establishments in Iowa
Populated places established in 1858